

Candidates for  President of  Republic of Macedonia 

Presidential candidates
Presidential candidates
Presidential candidates